is a Japanese manga artist. He is best known for Moyasimon: Tales of Agriculture and Maria the Virgin Witch; both of which were adapted into an anime television series.

Career 
He made his debut as a manga artist in 1997 with the short story Nippon Seifu Chokkatsu Kidō Sentai Kōmuin V in the magazine Bessatsu Young Magazine. In 1999 he won the Tetsuya Chiba Award for the short story Kami no Sumu Yama, which was later collected in the collection Hitokiri Ryōma.

His commercial and critical breakthrough came in 2004 with the series Moyasimon: Tales of Agriculture, which was serialized in the magazine Evening. The series won him the Kodansha Manga Award and the Tezuka Osamu Cultural Prize, both in 2008, as well as the Seiun Award in 2015.

Since 2015 he works on the series Madowanai Hoshi for the magazine Morning, set in a world devastated by climate change, in which humanity is forced to live in a dome.

Works
Nippon Seifu Chokkatsu Kidō Sentai Kōmuin V (日本政府直轄機動戦隊コームインV, 1997)
Kataribe (カタリベ, 1998–1999)
Kami no Sumu Yama (神の棲む山, 1999)
Shūkan Ishikawa Masayuki (週刊石川雅之, 2002–2003)
Kanojo no Kokuhaku (彼女の告白)
Moyasimon: Tales of Agriculture (もやしもん, Moyashimon, 2004–2014)
Hitokiri Ryōma (人斬り龍馬, 2005)
Maria the Virgin Witch (純潔のマリア, Junketsu no Maria, 2008–2013)
Junketsu no Maria Exhibition (純潔のマリア exhibition, 2014)
Teşekkür ederim (2014)
Madowanai Hoshi (惑わない星, since 2015)

References

External links 
 

Manga artists from Osaka Prefecture
People from Sakai, Osaka
Winner of Kodansha Manga Award (General)
1974 births
Living people